Minuscule 886 (in the Gregory-Aland numbering), is a 15th-century Greek minuscule manuscript of the New Testament on paper, with a commentary. The manuscript has not survived in complete condition.

Description 

The codex contains the text of the New Testament (except Catholic epistles), with a commentary, on 336 paper leaves (size ). The text is written in one column per page, 59 lines per page.

The commentary is of authorship of Nicetas of Naupactus in the Gospels, of Theophylact in the Acts of the Apostles and Pauline epistles. The Apocalypse has a commentary of an anonymous writer.

It contains the Eusebian Canon tables (before four Gospels),  lists before each biblical book.

Text 

Kurt and Barbara Aland gave the textual profile 2091, 992, 21/2, 14s in the Gospels, 151, 32, 31/2, 4s in the Acts, and 1711, 432, 91/2, 23s in the Pauline epistles. On the basis of this profile Alands placed it in Category V.
It means it is a representative of the Byzantine text-type.

It was not examined according to the Claremont Profile Method.

History 
The manuscript is dated by a colophon to the year 1454. Currently the manuscript is dated by the INTF to the 15th century.

It once belonged to Ignatius, metropolitan, then to Demetrius Leontari, then to Christian Baue in Berlin. The manuscript was described by Henry Stevenson. Gregory saw it in 1886. The text of the Apocalypse was collated by Herman C. Hoskier.

The manuscript was added to the list of New Testament manuscripts by Scrivener (698e), Gregory (886e).

The manuscript was digitized by the INTF.

Currently the manuscript is housed at the Vatican Library (Reg. gr. 6), in Rome.

See also 

 List of New Testament minuscules (1–1000)
 Biblical manuscript
 Textual criticism

References

Further reading 

 
 Henry Stevenson, Codices manuscripti Graeci Reginae Svecorum et Pii Pp. II. Bibliothecae Vaticanae, descripti praeside I.B. Cardinali Pitra, Rom 1888, pp. 4–6.

External links 
 

Greek New Testament minuscules
15th-century biblical manuscripts
Manuscripts of the Vatican Library